is a village located in Yoshino District, Nara Prefecture, Japan.

As of October 1, 2016, the village has an estimated population of 1,661 and a density of 13 persons per km². The total area is 131.60 km². It is also where the last Japanese wolf was shot and killed in 1905.

Geography
Located in central Nara Prefecture, the majority of the town is mountainous. Mount Kunimi, at 1419 m, is the highest mountain in the village. There are other mountains, such as Mount Takami, at 1248 m, situated in western portion of Higashiyoshino.
Rivers:Yoshino River
Mountains:Mount Kunimi, Mount Takami

Surrounding municipalities
Nara Prefecture
Kawakami
Yoshino
Uda
Soni
Mitsue
Mie Prefecture
Matsusaka

Sister cities

In Japan
Sakai, Osaka (October 18, 1986)

References

External links

 Higashiyoshino official website 

Villages in Nara Prefecture